Sir Jon Charles Trimmer  (born 18 September 1939), also known as Jonty Trimmer, is a New Zealand ballet dancer who was with the New Zealand Ballet Company in 1958 and 1959 and from 1970 to 2007.

Early life
Trimmer was born on 18 September 1939 in Petone, New Zealand. He started learning ballet at age 12 at his sister's ballet school.

In 1958, he joined the New Zealand Ballet Company where he worked until he left to study overseas.

Overseas experience
While overseas between 1959 and 1970 he:
attended the Royal Ballet School from 1960 to 1961
toured with the Sadler's Wells Ballet from 1962 to 1964
danced with The Australian Ballet from 1965 to 1966
danced with the Royal Danish Ballet from 1968 to 1969

Dancing with Royal New Zealand Ballet
In 1970 he returned to New Zealand to help revive the New Zealand Ballet and became the principal male dancer in that company. He has been with the company, now known as the Royal New Zealand ballet since then.

Among the many roles he has danced were Petrouchka and the role of Albrecht in Giselle.
He now dances character parts such as Captain Hook in Peter Pan.

Other work
Trimmer played the part of Edgar Marwick in Peter Sharp's 1986 movie Undercover Gang. Also in 1986, he appeared in the TV series Fireraiser and was nominated for the best actor award. In 2002 and 2003, he performed with Helen Moulder in her play Meeting Karpovsky.

Trimmer is patron of the Centastage theatrical company as well as Te Raukura ki Kapiti

Honours and awards
In the 1974 New Year Honours, Trimmer was appointed a Member of the Order of the British Empire, for services to ballet. In 1982, he was awarded a Fulbright Cultural Grant. In 1991, he was presented with a Scroll of Honour from the Variety Artists Club of New Zealand for services to entertainment and dance.

In the 1999 Queen's Birthday Honours, Trimmer was appointed a Knight Companion of the New Zealand Order of Merit, for services to ballet.

Personal life 
Trimmer met his wife Jacqui when they were both dancers in the New Zealand Ballet Company in 1958. He was 18 at the time. In the 1988 Queen's Birthday Honours, Jacqui Trimmer was appointed a Member of the Order of the British Empire, for services to ballet.

He has danced with Margot Fonteyn and Rudolf Nureyev.

References

External links
Royal New Zealand Ballet

1939 births
Living people
People educated at the Royal Ballet School
New Zealand Members of the Order of the British Empire
Knights Companion of the New Zealand Order of Merit
New Zealand male ballet dancers
People from Lower Hutt
People educated at Wellington High School, New Zealand
21st-century New Zealand dancers
20th-century New Zealand dancers
20th-century ballet dancers